Hogue Creek is a  tributary stream of Back Creek in Frederick County, Virginia. Hogue Creek rises on Great North Mountain and flows into Back Creek at Graves Hill.

Tributaries
Tributary streams are listed from headwaters to mouth.

Bucher Run
Indian Hollow Run

List of communities along Hogue Creek
Hayfield
Indian Hollow
McQuire

See also
List of Virginia rivers

References

Rivers of Frederick County, Virginia
Rivers of Virginia
Tributaries of the Potomac River